The boys' individual skills challenge at the 2012 Winter Youth Olympics was held between January 16 and 19, 2012 at Tyrolean Ice Arena in Innsbruck, Austria. Individual skills challenge based on six skills, with total points to determine final placements.

Qualification
The eight highest ranked will qualify (Q) to the Grand Final.

Grand Final
The players are ranked by total points. If still tied, by number of better skill rankings (number of ranks 1; if the same, number of ranks 2; if the same,number of ranks 3, etc.). If still tied, by overall seeding for the phase.

References

External links
iihf.com
olympedia.org

Boys' individual skills challenge